Head in the Clouds II is the second compilation album by musical collective 88rising. It was released through 88rising and 12Tone Music on October 11, 2019. Guest appearances include Chungha, Phum Viphurit, Generations from Exile Tribe, GoldLink, Jackson Wang, Swae Lee, Major Lazer, Rhyme So, and Barney Bones.

Promotion 
On August 17, 2019, 88rising held their "Head in the Clouds" festival for the second year in a row at the Los Angeles State Historic Park. Just three days prior, they released "Indigo" as the first single off their upcoming second iteration of the collaborative album. They announced that the creative design of the album would be led by Japanese sci-fi illustrator Hajime Sorayama and executive production of the album would be led by Joji.

On October 8, 2019, 88rising announced the full track listing with a short promotional video. Along with the track listing, features from artists such as GoldLink, Swae Lee, Generations from Exile Tribe and Major Lazer were mentioned.

Track listing 
Adapted from Apple Music.

Charts

References 

2019 compilation albums
Collaborative albums
88rising albums